The Numantine Museum of Soria located in Soria, Spain, focuses on the history of the province of Soria through art and archaeology. The name chosen for the museum, which means pertaining to Numantia, reflects the historical importance of Spain's most famous hill fort, which is a few kilometres from Soria. The museum also displays material relating to other Iron Age settlements in the province, notably Tiermes and Uxama, complementing small on-site museums.

History 
The museum was the result of a 1919 merger of two museums in Soria, the Provincial Museum founded in the 19th century and inaugurated in 1913, and the Museo Numantino that was developed from the study of the archaeological site of Numantia, that began in the 19th century and gained importance from 1906 to 1923.

The museum building was designed by Manuel Aníbal Álvarez and funded by Ramón Benito Aceña. It was constructed on land donated by the Council and inaugurated 18 September 1919 by Alfonso XIII. 

In 1932 the Museo Provincial changed its name to Museo Celtibérico. In 1941 the two museums united but maintained their independence until 1968. The integrated museums were called Museo Provincial de Soria first, then Museo de Soria and finally Museo Numantino. In 1989 it took on a total reform and the exposition was amplified up to 7.000 m².

Building 
The original building was one story with three wings among which there were two courtyards. In the 1980s was extended to a body of three floors in a building on the side of the courtyard. Conceived in chronological order, the visit begins in the Lower Paleolithic with the parts remaining of an Elephas Antiquus. From Bronze Age it can be highlighted weapons and tombstones and from the Iron Age, potteryare vessels and forts. From the Celtiberian stage are preserved pottery, brooches, pectorals, weapons and tools from the fields of Numancia, Uxama, Tiermes and others in the province. From the Roman period there are objects found in villages and cemeteries. Closes the provincial archaeological landscape the Middle Ages, from which there are preserved architectural ruins, pottery and coins.

Funds 
It has three floors in two wings, divided into six main exhibition halls. The permanent exhibition presents, in chronological order, the history of the province of Soria. It starts at the Lower Paleolithic and passes to the Upper Paleolithic, highlighting the Solutrean piece known as Placa de Villalba. The deposits of the southwest of the province provide a lot of Neolithic objects. Beaker Culture and the Bronze Age are also important pieces represented as belonging to the Covelda deposit and the Villar del Alba menhir.

The Iron Age has its representation obtained in several fields, but notably those of Numantia, Tiermes and Uxama. This period occupies the exhibition halls on the upper floors that make up  the  Celtiberian Section.

The Roman occupation was very important  due to its social and political changes. The museum displays findings from the sites of Cuevas de Soria, Santervás del Burgo and Quintanares de Rioseco also highlighting found at Numantia.

There's a Visigothic representation that comes from places that were consolidated as the towns of Numancia, Osma and Tiermes.

There are important Muslim pieces reflecting the strong Muslim presence in the province where they organised the Marca Media with capital in Medinaceli. After the Muslims left, the Christian repopulation implants Romanesque and Gothic art.

The exhibition Celtibérica is also chronologically ordered and divided into three periods, the old, full and late with many pieces in all. It can be highlighted the notable funerary pediment with swords and antennas, brooches, pectorals or spiral plate and funerary urns. Also relevant is the ceramic part.

The route is accessible for blind and partially sighted people to whom they are addressed a number of pieces and reproductions that can be touched.

References 

Archaeological museums in Spain
Museums in Castile and León
Province of Soria